Ginkgo Petrified Forest State Park/Wanapum Recreational Area is a geologic preserve and public recreation area covering  on the western shoreline of the Columbia River's Wanapum Reservoir at Vantage, Washington. Petrified wood was discovered in the region in the early 1930s, which led to creation of the state park as a national historic preserve. Over 50 species are found petrified at the site, including ginkgo, sweetgum, redwood, Douglas fir, walnut, spruce, elm, maple, horse chestnut, cottonwood, magnolia, madrone, sassafras, yew, and witch hazel.

History

Origin 
The strata the park lies in is identified as the Miocene epoch of the Neogene period, around 15.5 million years ago. During the Miocene, the region was lush and wet, home to many plant species now extinct. A number of these trees were buried in volcanic ash, and the organic matter in the tree trunks was gradually replaced by minerals in the groundwater; the resulting petrified wood was protected for millennia by flows of basalt. Near the end of the last ice age, the catastrophic Missoula Floods (about 15,000 BCE) eroded the basalt, exposing some of the petrified wood.

Original inhabitants
In prehistoric times, the Wanapum tribe of Native Americans inhabited the region along the Columbia River from the Beverly Gap to the Snake River. The Wanapum people first welcomed white strangers in the area during Lewis and Clark's expeditions across the United States.

They lived by fishing and agriculture, carved over 300 petroglyphs into the basalt cliffs, and may have used the petrified wood exposed by erosion for arrowheads and other tools. According to documentation at the park, Wanapum never fought white settlers, did not sign a treaty with them, and, as a result, retained no federally recognized right to the land.

First museum
Around 1927, highway workers noticed the petrified wood, leading geologist George F. Beck to organize excavations. The Civilian Conservation Corps completed the excavation, built a small museum, and opened the park to the public in 1938.

The petrified wood specimens in the museum were collected by Frank Walter Bobo, who was born 4 March 1894 in California. He moved to Cle Elum, Kittitas County, Washington. He became a "desert rat" digging petrified logs from the arid hills of Kittitas and Yakima counties.

Bobo was commissioned to collect, saw, and polish the specimens for the museum. He was partially compensated by being allowed to keep one-half of the specimens he prepared while on commission. His son, Don J. Bobo, Teanaway Valley, Washington, inherited his father's collection of about one ton of petrified wood.

Inundation
In 1963, Wanapum Dam was completed about four miles (6 km) downstream, raising the water level of the Columbia River. A new Interpretive Center was constructed and about 60 petroglyphs salvaged from the rising water. Many of the salvaged petroglyphs are on display at the Interpretive Center.

Recognition
In October 1965, the National Park Service designated the Ginkgo Petrified Forest as a National Natural Landmark. Petrified wood was named the Washington state gem by the state legislature in 1975.

Activities and amenities
The park museum has displays of both petrified wood and Wanapum petroglyphs. The park's Trees of Stone Interpretive Trail follows an exposed section of prehistoric Lake Vantage past 22 species of petrified logs that were left where they were discovered in the 1930s. The trail includes a 1.5-mile loop through sagebrush-covered hills and a longer 2.5-mile loop. The park also has  of Columbia River shoreline with swimming and boating access as well as camping facilities.

References

External links 

Ginkgo Petrified Forest / Wanapum Recreational Area Washington State Parks and Recreation Commission
Ginkgo Petrified Forest Map Washington State Parks and Recreation Commission
Wanapum Recreational Area Map Washington State Parks and Recreation Commission

State parks of Washington (state)
Ginkgo Petrified Forest
Museums in Kittitas County, Washington
Natural history museums in Washington (state)
Geology museums in the United States
Petroglyphs in Washington (state)
Native American museums in Washington (state)
Civilian Conservation Corps in Washington (state)
Parks in Kittitas County, Washington
Protected areas established in 1938
Petrified forests
Fossil parks in the United States
Paleontology in Washington (state)